Herbie Kay, born Herbert Kaumeyer (1904 – May 11, 1944, Dallas, Texas) was an American trumpeter and big band leader.

Kay's career began while he was a student at Northwestern University, where he played in dance bands in the mid-1920s. He led his own group from the late 1920s, and played extensively in the Chicago area from the early 1930s to the early 1940s, including a longstanding residency at the Blackhawk Restaurant. Kay hired Dorothy Lamour as a vocalist in 1934, and married her in 1935; by 1936, Lamour had moved to Hollywood to pursue a film career, and her marriage to Kay ended in 1939.

He recorded for Vocalion and Columbia Records and toured throughout the Western US; his band’s songs included a specially-written novelty dance tune, “Rhythm Steps”. For most of his career, he led a band with four saxophones, four brass instruments, and three rhythm instruments. Singers included Shirley Lloyd, Fuzzy Combs, King Harvey, and a vocal trio called “The Three Kays”. He dissolved the group in the early 1940s and moved to Dallas, where he died in 1944.

References

1904 births
1944 deaths
American bandleaders
American trumpeters
American male trumpeters
20th-century American male musicians
Northwestern University alumni